The Roman Catholic Diocese of Bathurst (in Canada) (originally Diocese of Chatham) is a suffragan of the Archdiocese of Moncton. It has its cathedral episcopal see, Sacred Heart Cathedral, in Bathurst, New Brunswick, Canada.

History 

On 8 May, 1860, the Diocese of St. John was divided, creating the Diocese of Chatham. The diocese comprises the northern half of the Province of New Brunswick, including the counties of Gloucester, Madawaska, Northumberland, Restigouche, Victoria, and the part of Kent north of the Richibucto River. This territory formerly belonged to the Diocese of St. John, itself originally a portion of the Archdiocese of Quebec. James Rogers was appointed the first bishop and consecrated 15 August in the same year. On his arrival at Chatham, Bishop Rogers found only seven priests to attend an immense stretch of country. During his episcopate of forty-two years, the diocese greatly expanded; by the time he resigned on 7 August, 1902, he left a diocese of 47 parishes and 51 priests. On the resignation of Bishop Rogers, Thomas Francis Barry, consecrated titular Bishop of Thugga and Coadjutor of Chatham, on 7 August, 1902, succeeded to the See of Chatham.

The steady march of development, facility of communication, and immigration, required the formation of new parishes each year; by 1908 the diocese contained 57 churches with resident priests and 25 missions with churches. The Catholic population in 1908 numbered about 66,000; a large percentage of which is French Acadian by descent and language. At the time, the secular clergy numbered 65 priests, with 5 theological students, and the regular 31 priests and 7 brothers. Sisters, numbering about 200, of several religious congregations, were in charge of various institutions. There were 8 parochial schools with about 1000 pupils, one classical college (at Caraquet) for boys, directed by the Eudist Fathers, with 130 pupils, and 3 schools taught by Sisters under the Government School Law, with about 400 pupils. Two orphan asylums supported 100 orphans, and 4 hospitals are directed by the Hospital Sisters of St. Joseph, among them the government hospital for lepers at Tracadie. The Trappist Fathers and the Trappistine Sisters, expelled from France, have opened monasteries in the parish of Rogersville.

Bishop Thomas Barry served as Bishop of Chatam until 1920, when he was succeeded by Patrice Chiasson, who moved the see to the francophone settlement of Bathurst. The diocese was renamed as such in 1938, before 

The next appointment in 1920 was a French speaker. By this time the French were in a majority in the diocese, and Bishop Patrice Chiasson decided to move his headquarters to Bathurst, a majority French-speaking area. The move was complete in 1938 and it was renamed on 13 March 1938.

Territorial losses

Bishops

Bishops of the diocese
James Rogers (1860 - 1902)
Thomas Francis Barry (1902 - 1920)
Patrice Alexandre Chiasson, C.I.M. (1920 - 1942)
Camille-André Le Blanc (1942 - 1969)
Edgar Godin (1969 - 1985)
Arsène Richard (1985 - 1989)
André Richard, C.S.C. (1989 - 2002), appointed Archbishop of Moncton, New Brunswick
Valéry Vienneau (2002 - 2012), appointed Archbishop of Moncton, New Brunswick
Daniel Jodoin (2013 - 2022), appointed, Bishop of Nicolet, Québec

Coadjutor bishop
Thomas Francis Barry (1899-1902)

Auxiliary bishop
Louis James O'Leary (1914-1920), appointed Bishop of Charlottetown, Prince Edward Island

Other priests of this diocese who became bishops
 Henry Joseph O'Leary, appointed Bishop of Charlottetown, Prince Edward Island in 1913
 Louis-Joseph-Arthur Melanson, appointed Bishop of Gravelbourg, Saskatchewan in 1932
 Norbert Robichaud, appointed Archbishop of Moncton, New Brunswick in 1942
 Donat Chiasson, appointed Archbishop of Moncton, New Brunswick in 1972
 Joseph Edward Troy, appointed Coadjutor Bishop of Saint John, New Brunswick in 1984

External links and references 
 Roman Catholic Diocese of Bathurst site 
 GigaCatholic, with incumbent biographies
 First Catholic Bishop of Bathurst Accessed October 17, 2012
 
 Bathurst School Controversy in 1860s Accessed October 17, 2012

Bathurst
Religious organizations established in 1860
Bathurst
Bathurst, New Brunswick
Catholic Church in New Brunswick
Organizations based in New Brunswick
1860 establishments in New Brunswick